Anthony Clemmons (born August 15, 1994) is an American-born naturalized Kazakhstani professional basketball player for Frutti Extra Bursaspor of the Turkish Basketbol Süper Ligi (BSL). At 1.93 meters tall, he plays in the position of point guard.

College career 
He played four seasons with the Iowa Hawkeyes and averaged 8.9 points and 3.7 assists per game as a senior.

Professional career 
After not being chosen in the 2016 NBA Draft, in August he signed his first professional contract with the BC Zepter Vienna of Austria with which he would average 17.9 points per game with 4.7 rebounds and 4.5 assists per game .

In June 2017 he signed with BC Astana of Kazakhstan. Clemmons averaged 13.4 points, 5.5 assists and 3.4 rebounds per game in the 2018–19 season.

On July 17, 2019, he signed with Monaco. Clemmons averaged 10.6 points and 2.4 assists per game.

On July 2, 2020, he signed with KK Igokea of the Bosnian league. He averaged 11.2 points, 2.3 rebounds, 4.5 assists, and 1.3 steals per game.

On July 28, 2021, Clemmons signed with Dinamo Sassari of the Lega Basket Serie A. In six games, he averaged 10.2 points, 2.8 rebounds and 2.5 assists per game.

On November 10, Clemmons signed with Türk Telekom of the Turkish Basketball Super League.

On April 21, 2022, he has signed with San Pablo Burgos of the Liga ACB.

On June 15, 2022, he has signed with Frutti Extra Bursaspor of the Turkish Basketbol Süper Ligi (BSL).

References

External links 
 Profile at sports-reference.com
 Profile on espn.com
 File at realgm.com
 Profile on eurobasket.com
 Iowa Hawkeyes bio

Living people
1994 births
Iowa Hawkeyes men's basketball players
American men's basketball players
American expatriate basketball people in Austria
American expatriate basketball people in Bosnia and Herzegovina
American expatriate basketball people in Italy
American expatriate basketball people in Kazakhstan
American expatriate basketball people in Monaco
AS Monaco Basket players
Basketball players from Michigan
BC Astana players
Bursaspor Basketbol players
KK Igokea players
Point guards
Sportspeople from Lansing, Michigan
Türk Telekom B.K. players